Akantigsi Afoko was a Ghanaian teacher and politician. He was a member of the Legislative Assembly representing the Northern territories from 1951 to 1954. In 1954 he was elected to represent the Builsa electoral district in the Legislative Assembly, he was re-elected in 1956 and maintained his post as the member of parliament for the constituency until 1965. In 1965 he became the member of parliament for the Sandema constituency. He served in this capacity until the ousting of the Nkrumah government in 1966. Prior to politics Afoko was a trained teacher who taught at Fumbisi, a town in the Builsa District of Ghana.

Early life and education
Afoko was born in 1923 at Sandema in the then Northern Territories of the then Gold Coast (now in the Upper East Region of Ghana). He started primary school in 1936 at Sandema and completed his primary school education in 1940. In 1941 he entered the Tamale Middle School and his middle school education ended in 1944. He trained as a teacher at the Government Teacher Training College from 1945 to 1946 and obtained his Teachers' Certificate B. After teaching for a year at Fumbisi (a town in the Builsa District), he returned to the Government Teacher Training College in 1949 and received his Teachers' Certificate A in 1950.

Career and politics
He was the teacher in charge of the Fumbisi Day School from 1947 to 1948. He was elected into the legislative assembly in 1951 as a territorial member of the Northern Territories. In the 1954 election he was elected to represent the Builsa electoral district in the legislative assembly on the ticket of the Convention People's Party (CPP). He was re-elected in the 1956 election again on the ticket of the CPP to represent Builsa. In July 1957 Afoko resigned from the CPP to join the Northern People's Party. He re-joined the CPP on 12 March 1958. He represented the Builsa constituency in parliament from then until 1965. In 1965 he became the member of parliament for the Sandema constituency. He remained in parliament until the overthrow of the Nkrumah government in 1966.

Personal life
Afoko is the uncle of the former chairman of the New Patriotic Party; Paul Afoko.
His hobby was agriculture.

See also
 List of MLAs elected in the 1951 Gold Coast legislative election
 List of MLAs elected in the 1954 Gold Coast legislative election
 List of MLAs elected in the 1956 Gold Coast legislative election
 List of MPs elected in the 1965 Ghanaian parliamentary election

References

1923 births
Date of death missing
Ghanaian MPs 1951–1954
Ghanaian MPs 1954–1956
Ghanaian MPs 1956–1965
Ghanaian MPs 1965–1966
Convention People's Party (Ghana) politicians
20th-century Ghanaian politicians